Tecula mecula (Spanish: Técula mécula) is a dessert traditional to Olivenza, which belonged to Portugal until the early 19th century, but now belongs to the region of Extremadura in western Spain.  It is made from almonds, egg yolks, sugar and sometimes acorns.

See also
 List of almond dishes
 List of desserts

External links
 spain.info
 Several different recipes, in Spanish

Extremaduran cuisine
Almond dishes